Peanut punch is a beverage that is popular in the Caribbean. The main ingredients of the drink include peanuts/peanut butter, milk and sugar. However, variations occur whereby regular milk is often replaced or added to a mixture including condensed milk, spices (dominantly nutmeg and cinnamon), corn flakes, Angostura bitters, glucose powder and quite often granola mix. The drink is often regarded by some to be an aphrodisiac due to its high fat, protein and overall energy content.

In Trinidad, it is made with peanut butter, milk, sugar and sometimes spices. Rum is sometimes used as an ingredient. It is also available commercially in supermarkets and grocery stores  as well to cater those markets. In Trinidad and Tobago, peanut punch is a popular drink that is often sold on sidewalks or in established food stores. The drink is traditionally marketed as an energy drink and made with a variety of ingredients according to the vendor.

In Jamaica, peanut punch is made with roasted peanuts, peanut butter, or commercial peanut powder mixes. White rum or stout beer is often added, as well as condensed milk or another sweetener with milk, water, and spices.

See also

 List of peanut dishes

References

External links 

 Peanut Punch - Recipes - Cooks.com

Non-alcoholic drinks
Caribbean drinks
Trinidad and Tobago cuisine
Guyanese cuisine
Jamaican cuisine
Peanut butter
Peanut dishes